Prahaar may refer to:
 Prahaar (newspaper), an Indian Marathi-language newspaper
 Prahaar: The Final Attack, a 1991 Hindi-language film
 Prahaar missile, a Tactical Ballistic Missile of India